Karolína Plíšková and Kristýna Plíšková were the defending champions, but both were participating in the 2012 Citi Open.

Julia Glushko and Olivia Rogowska won the title defeating Jacqueline Cako and Natalie Pluskota in the final 6–4, 5–7, [10–7].

Seeds

Draw

Draw

References
 Main Draw
 Qualifying Draw

Odlum Brown Vancouver Open
Vancouver Open